Andreas Jensen may refer to:

 Andreas Holm Jensen (born 1988), Danish footballer
 Andreas S. Jensen, singer-songwriter